Satya Pathe is a 1935 Bengali film directed by Amar Choudhury.

Plot

Cast 
 Jahar Gangopadhyay
 Amar Chowdhury 
 Dhiraj Bhattacharya
 Ashu Bose
 Chittaranjan Goswami
 Chunibala
 Dolly Dutta
 Indubala
 Kartik Roy
 Kiran Ray
 Tarakumar Bhattacharya

References

External links 
 Satya Pathe at CITWF

1935 films
Bengali-language Indian films
1930s Bengali-language films
Indian black-and-white films